John Ken Lukyamuzi, more commonly known as Ken Lukyamuzi, is a Ugandan politician and lawyer, who is the leader of the Conservative Party of Uganda. He served in the 7th parliament (2001–2006) as the elected representative for Lubaga South (Rubaga South) Constituency. He represented the same constituency in the 9th parliament (2011–2016)

Education
Sometime in 2013, Ken Lukyamuzi was admitted to Makerere University's School of Law. After six years of study, including several retakes, he was awarded a Bachelor of Laws degree in January 2019.

Career
Ken Lukyamuzi represented Lubaga South Constituency in Uganda's parliament from 2001 until 2006. However, due to his failure to declare personal assets, as required by law, he was kicked out of parliament in January 2006. Suzan Nampijja Lukyamuzi, a daughter to Ken Lukyamuzi was elected to replace her father and represented the constituency in the 8th parliament (2006–2011).

Ken Lukyamuzi sued the Inspector General of Government (IGG) for wrongful dismissal from parliament. The Uganda Supreme Court agreed with Lukyamuzi and awarded him back pay and removed the restriction to run for political office that had been placed on him by the IGG.

During the 9th parliament (2011–2016), Ken Lukyamuzi bounced back and was elected a second time to represent Lubaga South Constituency. During the 2016 election cycle, Ken Lukyamuzi lost his constituency to the incumbent MP, Kato Lubwama, an independent politician, whose other occupation is as a comedian.

Other considerations
Ken Lukyamuzi is a conservationist, who is reported to have founded the Wildlife Club of Uganda, together with the late Ponsiano Semwezi and the late Professor Eric Edroma.

References

External links
Lukyamuzis are born leaders As of 8 February 2006.

Year of birth missing (living people)
Living people
Ganda people
People from Kampala
Makerere University alumni
Ugandan conservationists
Conservative Party (Uganda) politicians
Members of the Parliament of Uganda
Leaders of political parties in Uganda
21st-century Ugandan politicians